Prasophyllum rostratum, commonly known as the slaty leek orchid, is a species of orchid endemic to Tasmania. It has a single tubular leaf and up to twenty five well-spaced, greenish-brown flowers. It is similar to P. pyriforme from mainland Australia but lacks that species' white to pinkish labellum.

Description
There is a raised, fleshy, more or less bulbous callus in its centre. The labellum has a tail-like tip. Flowering occurs from October to December and is strongly promoted by fires the previous summer.

Taxonomy and naming
Prasophyllum rostratum was first formally described in 1840 by John Lindley and the description was published in The Genera and Species of Orchidaceous Plants. The specific epithet (rostratum) is a Latin word meaning "beaked" or "curved", referring to the tail-like tip of the labellum.

Distribution and habitat
The slaty leek orchid grows in a range of heath and sedge habitats, mainly in the north and north-west of Tasmania.

References

External links 
 

rostratum
Flora of Tasmania
Endemic orchids of Australia
Plants described in 1840